, Op. 214, is a polka in A major by Johann Strauss II, written in 1858 after a successful tour of Russia where he performed in the summer concert season at Pavlovsk, Saint Petersburg. It was first performed in a concert in Vienna on 24 November 1858.

 (chit-chat) refers to the Viennese passion for gossip. Strauss may also have been referencing the burlesque  by the famous Austrian dramatist and actor Johann Nestroy, which premiered in 1833 and was still in the stage repertoire when the polka was written.

The mood of the piece is jaunty and high-spirited, as were many of Strauss' polkas.

References

External links
 
 
 Tritsch-Tratsch-Polka, vienna.cc
 , Vienna Philharmonic, Zubin Mehta (Heldenplatz, Vienna, 1999)
 , by György Cziffra, played by Yuja Wang

Compositions by Johann Strauss II
1858 compositions
Polkas
Compositions set in Vienna
Compositions in A major